Urvashi Devi Gooriah (born March 8 January 1999) is a Mauritian model, entrepreneur and beauty pageant titleholder who was crowned Miss Mauritius 2018. She represented Mauritius at Miss World and is an active member as VOY at Unicef. Urvashi has represented her country during the Miss World 2019 pageant competition.

Miss Mauritius Competition 2018
Miss World 2019

References

External links
 
 
 

Living people
1999 births
Mauritian female models
Mauritian beauty pageant winners
Mauritian Hindus
Mauritian people of Indian descent
Female models of Indian descent